Asiab (also Romanized as Āsīāb, Āsīyāb, and Asyāb) is a village in Asiab Rural District, in the Central District of Omidiyeh County, Khuzestan Province, Iran. At the 2006 census, its population was 780, in 170 families.

References 

Populated places in Omidiyeh County